The Lexington-class battlecruisers were officially the only class of battlecruiser to ever be ordered by the United States Navy. The fact they were not approved by Congress at the time of their initial request was due to political, not military considerations.

The Lexingtons were included as part of the Naval Act of 1916. Like the  battleships also included in the 1916 Act, their construction was repeatedly postponed in favor of escort ships and anti-submarine vessels.

The design challenges the Navy's Bureau of Construction and Repair (C&R) faced with this class were considerable, as the combined requirements of optimum hitting power, extreme speed and adequate protection taxed the knowledge of its naval architects and the technology of the time. The desired speed of 35 knots had been attained previously only in destroyers and smaller craft. To do so with a capital ship required a hull and a power plant of unprecedented size for a U.S. naval vessel and careful planning on the part of its designers to ensure it would have enough longitudinal strength to withstand bending forces underway and the added stresses on its structure associated with combat. Even so, it took years between initial and final designs for engine and boiler technology to provide a plant of sufficient power that was also compact enough to allow a practical degree of protection, even in such large ships.

While four of the ships were eventually canceled and scrapped on their building ways in 1922 to comply with the Washington Naval Treaty, two ( and ) were converted into the United States' first fleet carriers. Both saw extensive action in World War II, with Lexington conducting a number of raids before being sunk during the Battle of the Coral Sea and Saratoga serving in multiple campaigns in the Pacific and the Indian Ocean. Though she was hit by torpedoes on two different occasions, Saratoga survived the war only to be sunk as a target ship during Operation Crossroads.

Background

Armor or speed
As early as 1903, questions arose in the Naval War College (NWC) about the overall effectiveness of large armored cruisers such as the - and  vessels just then coming into service. The NWC's 1903 annual summer conference report, which included a staff memorandum on all-big-gun capital ships, also suggested a new type of cruiser that would be armed and armored much like a battleship. The following year, the summer conference considered tactics for a ship armed with four , twenty-two  guns, four submerged torpedo tubes and battleship-type protection. Ships such as these were essentially Tennessee-class ships in which the  intermediate battery had been traded for heavier main guns and protection. These ships figured in the college's studies for several years, and its 1906 summer conference report on a US building program strongly advocated the ships' construction for use in scouting and as fast wings in a fleet action, and for their resistance to 12-inch gunfire (much greater than the Tennessee class). Although the General Board and the Secretary of the Navy refused to adopt the proposed new armored cruiser, perhaps because the Navy already had 10 new armored cruisers on hand, the college continued to test the design against a variety of foreign vessels, including the British .

By 1908, the summer conference had come to favor battlecruisers over armored cruisers. The increasing range of torpedoes and the distances at which future gun battles were expected to be fought seemed to favor speed over armor. Gunnery officers "laid great stress upon the value of getting the range first and then smothering, or beating down, the enemy's fire before he gets the range." The conference concluded that battlecruisers would be worth building, with the caveat that they be considered in the same category as armored cruisers, in support of the battle fleet but not to fight in the line with fully armored battleships. A majority report recommended a top speed of at least 20 percent above that of battleships. The Bureau of Construction and Repair (C&R) sketched out such ships the following year, at the request of the Secretary of the Navy, as fast equivalents of the  ships being considered. An enlarged belt was required by a deeper hull, as all American battlecruiser studies required deep hulls to retain their girder strength because those hulls had to be abnormally long to attain their speed. If the armor belt were reduced by an average of three inches, a fifth turret could be added. Four intermediate proposals included one with intermediate armor and eight 12-inch guns and one with Wyoming armor and six 12-inch guns. None of these designs included superfiring turrets. The General Board retained these sketches but did not recommend construction.

Pacific developments
As the NWC continued its studies, the Imperial Japanese Navy (IJN) annihilated the Russian Baltic Fleet at the Battle of Tsushima in 1905. Japan had already been a concern of the U.S. Navy. Strategist and Admiral Alfred Thayer Mahan had warned then-Assistant Secretary of the Navy Theodore Roosevelt in 1897 of a much greater likelihood of conflict in the Pacific than in the Atlantic. Roosevelt himself, as President of the United States, had written before Tsushima to British diplomat Cecil Spring Rice, "The Japs interest me and I like them. I am perfectly well aware that if they win out it may possibly mean a struggle between them and us in the future." Tsushima sealed the outcome of the Russo-Japanese War in Japan's favor, signaled its emergence as a world power and began a period of rivalry with the United States over intentions in the Pacific theater, as the two now became the dominant military powers there. An immediate consequence was the four  armored cruisers, laid down between 1905 and 1908. These ships were designed to carry four  guns, a size generally allocated to capital ships and unprecedented for armored cruisers. The Tsukubas were intended to take the place of aging battleships and thus showed Japan's intention of continuing to use armored cruisers in fleet engagements. They were also exactly the type of ships for which the college had argued unsuccessfully to add to the U.S. Navy before switching to battlecruisers.

Therefore, while the Navy did not react as Germany and Britain built increasing numbers of battlecruisers, it took a very different tack when Japan laid down its first ship of this class, in Britain on 17 January 1911. On 13 June, U.S. Naval Intelligence confirmed she was to be the first of four ships, the other three to be built in Japan, which would form a fast division for the IJN. The following day, the Secretary of the Navy asked the General Board to consider the construction of American battlecruisers for Pacific service, as the Pennsylvanias and Tennessees would no longer be viable units in the face of such opposition. The General Board, not willing to forego battleship construction in favor of auxiliary types such as battlecruisers, balked. In other words, the board requested an American version of the Kongō.

In view of the board's lack of urgency, C&R took nearly a year to research this project. The proposed main battery of eight 14-inch guns was kept constant while other factors were calculated—speeds of 26, 29 and 32 knots; operating ranges of 5000, 7000 and 8000 miles; and belt armor of 8, 11 and 14 inches. On 12 July 1912, Naval Constructor R.H. Robinson presented these studies at a lecture he gave at the Naval War College with the General Board in attendance. There, he emphasized 8 inches as an absolute minimum for armor protection and recommended a radius of 8000 miles, the same as in U.S. battleships. The General Board's reaction was to request two battlecruisers for the 1914 Naval Building Program and ask C&R for a slightly modified version of the proposed ship, but the Naval War College felt the design had serious problems and that a fast battleship would be a more practical option.

There was also the political climate to consider—and the weather was not good for battlecruisers. Just as it was thought that Congress would not approve any battlecruisers without reducing the number of battleships, the Navy decided that battleships, such as the new "super-dreadnought"  whose construction had just begun, were more important since Congress—in the Navy's eyes—was not approving enough battleships. In 1903 the General Board assumed that the U.S. would build two battleships per year, but Congress "balked", approving just one ship in 1904 (fiscal year 1905), two ships in 1905 (FY 1906), one ship in both 1906 and 1907 (FY 1907–1908), and one ship in both 1912 and 1913 (FY 1913–1914). The approval of two  ships in 1910 (FY 1911) instead of just one was apparently "something of a personal triumph for Secretary of the Navy von Lengerke Meyer."

Five years later—with the First World War raging in Europe—the political climate had changed. A tentative five-year program put together in October and supported by President Woodrow Wilson called for ten battleships, six battlecruisers and ten destroyers to be completed by 1922. This was submitted to Congress in December 1915. On 2 June 1916, the House of Representatives passed the bill in a modified form, replacing five of the battleships with battlecruisers. On 29 August 1916, the Senate also passed an altered bill, keeping the original number of ships but stipulating that the program be completed in three years (FY 1917–19). The first four ships were paid for in FY 1917, the fifth in FY 1918, and the last in FY 1919.

The six Lexington-class ships were named Lexington, Constellation, Saratoga, Ranger, Constitution, and United States and were designated CC-1 through CC-6, with "CC" signifying their status as battlecruisers. Although the class was planned to be the U.S.'s first battlecruisers, it was not of a new design; instead, it expanded upon already-existing 10,000–14,000 ton cruiser designs.

Design development
In their original 1916 configuration, the battlecruisers were to carry ten 14"/50 caliber guns in four turrets, with two triple superfiring over two dual because there was not enough beam to accommodate the larger barbettes of the triple turrets slight further forward and aft. All of these specifications were tempered by their sparse armor compared with contemporary battleships. C&R estimated 180,000 shaft horsepower would be needed to obtain this planned speed. This would require 24 boilers, which became problematic, as there was not enough room for the boilers under the armored deck in such a long, comparatively narrow hull. The solution decided upon was to place half of the boilers above the deck on the centerline with armored boxes fitted around each one. There was also the challenge of the many exhaust uptakes needed. The Lexingtons were given "no less than" seven funnels, four of them side by side.

Also, with such a long, narrow hull came a consequent penchant for bending, which led to the challenge of adequate hull strength, especially longitudinal strength. This challenge was complicated in a capital ship by the heavy weight of main turrets and guns. This was an area in which British battlecruisers were notably deficient. Structural members on HMS Invincible were so weak that her double-bottom frames distorted.  had to go into drydock immediately following her preliminary gunnery tests because the hull structure could not withstand the bending stresses from firing her forward main guns. When the "large light cruiser"  weathered a heavy gale during her initial trial run, a number of her outer hull plates were so distorted that they had to be removed, sent back to the foundry and renewed.

In the Lexingtons longitudinal strength was challenged further by the large amount of freeboard required at the forward section of the hull to keep the ships dry and maintain a high speed in various types of weather. Because of the difference in ultimate tensile strength between armor steel and hull steel, severe stresses on the hull were expected. These factors plus the ships' unusual length prompted Naval Constructor R. H. Robinson, who led the design group for the Lexingtons, to make careful analyses of strength, buoyancy and stresses expected in service. For instance, designers assumed customarily that a ship needed to withstand stresses caused by a wave of the ship's length with a ratio of height to length of 1:20. Robinson found a more reasonable ratio at 1:26 for the Lexingtons, which also promised considerable savings in weight.

One suggestion from C&R was to make the belt armor a load-bearing member by connecting plates end to end. This was found inordinately difficult to be practical and, while it would have added girder strength where most badly needed, was considered too radical a proposition to be truly safe. Another idea, subsequently adopted, was to design the forecastle to break abaft the turrets. The challenge then became to continue the longitudinal strength contributed by the armored deck past this point to the end of the stern. This became a difficult design problem, especially with the need to save weight wherever possible and the fact that light structural members combined with heavy armament weight had become a source of grief for the British. A third idea, also adopted, was to continue the longitudinal bulkhead between the protective and splinter decks down to the bottom of the ship to add strength. Even so, the size of the power plant meant pushing the main turrets further toward the ends of the ships, which increased hull stress. This was why the idea was adopted to place half the boilers above the armored deck.

Construction hold and redesign
Plans to begin construction were placed on hold in 1917. Large numbers of anti-submarine warfare vessels and merchant ships were needed to ensure the safe passage of men and materiel to Europe during Germany's U-boat campaign and were given top priority. This opened the opportunity for a massive redesign, the need for which had become apparent in light of experience gained in the Battle of Jutland, fought shortly after the initial design for the Lexingtons had been approved and in which three British battlecruisers had been lost. The fact that the U.S. Navy misunderstood the essential points of the battle initially was shown by its ignoring the Lexingtons staying power while increasing their main armament to eight 50-caliber  guns and their secondary armament to fourteen 6"/53 caliber guns. Only 20 of a newer style of boiler were needed, few enough to fit below the armored deck, and the number of funnels was reduced to five. The armor scheme was not modified, as that would have compromised the longitudinal strength of the hull.

Her side armor was comparable to that of previous battleships and her deck armor was the most extensive of any British capital ship. Because this ship was described as a "fast battleship" and the British Admiralty considered her a replacement for both the battleship and the battlecruiser, the staff advocated that the United States should develop a similar vessel of its own. Chief Constructor David Taylor agreed. On 8 April 1918, he told the Lexington design staff to plan a vessel combining the principal features of battleship and battlecruiser so that it would have the maximum possible speed, main armament and protection. Moreover, designs were to be prepared and submitted quickly.

The Royal Navy temporarily assigned a young constructor, Stanley Goodall, to C&R to assist in this task. Goodall brought a copy of the plans of Hood and accurate accounts of shell damage at the Battle of Jutland. In addition, a senior U.S. constructor who served on Admiral Sims's staff in London, L.C. McBride, became privy to much British experience and was able to share it with C&R. While C&R worked concurrently on the more conventional, more heavily armed and armored South Dakota class, it quickly adopted and incorporated ideas from Hood into the Lexington project which included a reduction of the main armor belt, the change to "sloped armor" and the addition of four above-water torpedo tubes that were added to the four underwater tubes that had been included in the original design.

Four proposed redesigns were submitted to the General Board on 3 June 1918, along with a letter that requested a formal reconsideration by the Navy that the Lexingtons be armored to protect them only against fire of guns six inches and smaller. The Board, concerned about the delay incorporating any of the redesigns would have on not just the Lexingtons but the 1916 building program in general and the subsequent cost, declined all four designs. The Board also feared that producing heavily armored fast battleships such as Hood would make the U.S. Navy's Standard type battleships obsolete, just as HMS Dreadnought made the Royal Navy's pre-dreadnought battleships obsolescent and negated its advantage in numbers over other navies. This did not stop the U.S. Commander in Chief in European waters, Admiral William S. Sims, to argue for the redesigned vessels by pointing out that Hood had already brought about the very revolution that the Board wished to suppress. Debate continued while the project remained suspended until May 1919, when the Board decided that the battlecruisers should be built as planned, except for a slightly slower version of Design B from C&R with increased protection for turrets, conning towers, magazines and communications. This amended version, labeled B3, was the final version of the Lexington battlecruiser design.

Design

General characteristics
Because the demand for extreme speed necessitated a long hull with maximum freeboard, the forecastle was extended down 75 percent of the total length of the hull. For this class, Rear Admiral David W. Taylor, who served as Chief Constructor for the Bureau of Construction and Repair, used a relatively new kind of bow called the bulbous bow or Taylor bow. The result of a series of towing tests begun in 1910, this bow reduced water resistance by an average of six percent, supported the forecastle and reduced bending stress on the hull. At speeds of more than 25 knots, test results were highly favorable. A disadvantage was the formation of a heavy layer of water which would creep up along the outer plating of the forecastle at higher speeds. However, this tendency could be reduced to some degree by careful design of the frames.

Propulsion
Turbo-electric propulsion was selected for the battlecruisers despite the fact it needed more room than geared turbines to allow for better underwater protection that wartime experience showed was essential. First used in the s, it also had several other advantages. The turbines could run at their optimum speed, without regard to propeller speed, which was economical on fuel and the machinery could be easily sub-divided which increased the ships' ability to withstand torpedo hits. The substitution of flexible electric cables for bulky steam-lines meant that the motors could be mounted further to the rear of the ship, which reduced both vibration and weight by shortening the propeller shafts. Also, the ship could go astern at full power simply by reversing the electrical polarity of the motors. Despite these factors and the fact that American companies would have struggled to produce the very large geared steam turbines needed for such big ships, the Curtis Company tried unsuccessfully to convince the Navy to reverse this decision. The Navy countered that doing so would mean a complete rearrangement of machinery spaces and a reduction in underwater protection.

These motors were about five times the size of any earlier electric motor. Each of the four AC alternators produced 40,000 KVA. Six  DC turbo generators were installed in the upper levels of the two main turbine compartments.

Armament

Main guns
The original design of the Lexington class called for ten 14"/50 caliber guns of either the Mark 4, 5, or 6 variety to be mounted in four turrets (two triple superfiring over two double turrets) for the main armament. Designed in 1916 and put into service by 1918, these guns were installed on the - and New Mexico-class battleships.

Later designs called for eight 16"/50 caliber Mark 2 gun, also slated to be used on the  battleship of 1920. Like the 14"/50 caliber gun, the 16" gun was designed in 1916.

A prototype Mark 2 was tested and proven on 8 April 1918, and the gun was scheduled to go into naval service in 1923. However, with the cancellation of both the Lexington and the South Dakota classes, no guns were installed on any ships even though 71 had been built and 44 were under construction. In 1922–24, twenty of the guns were given to the Army for use as coastal defense guns along with the Army's 16"/50 caliber M1919 guns. Later planning called for the use of these guns in the s, but miscommunication between design bureaus led to the 16"/50 caliber Mark 7 gun being used instead. As a result, all but three of the Navy's remaining Mark 2 and 3 guns were sent to the Army to also be used as coastal defense guns.

Secondary guns
The original design called for eighteen 5"/51 caliber guns. These guns were originally mounted on the - and s, but they found their way into the secondary armament of every U.S. battleship that was built prior to the Washington Naval Treaty. Also, many of the destroyers, submarines, and auxiliaries that were built during this time mounted this gun as their main gun.

The secondary armament was later upped to fourteen 6"/53 caliber guns in Mark 13 casemate mountings during one of the redesigns. Designed in 1920 and in service by 1923, these guns became the main armament on the  light cruisers, and  submarines, and they were intended as secondary armament on the South Dakota-class battleships.

Anti-aircraft guns
Four 3"/23 caliber Mark 11 anti-aircraft guns were planned for the original and first redesigned versions of the Lexingtons. This was increased to eight guns in the final version. These could depress to −10 degrees and elevate to 85 degrees.

Torpedo tubes
Eight  torpedo tubes were to be carried. Four of these would be mounted inside the hull below the waterline, two at either side of the bow; the others would be above the waterline at the stern, two at either side.

Armor

The waterline belt of the Lexington-class ships tapered  in thickness from top to bottom and was angled 11° outwards at the top to increase the armor's relative thickness to horizontal, close-range fire (a concept taken from HMS Hood). The downside to this practice was a reduction of the relative height of the belt, which increased the chance of plunging shellfire going over or under it. The belt covered the middle  of the ships. Forward, the belt ended in a bulkhead also tapered from seven to five inches in thickness. Aft, it terminated at a seven-inch bulkhead. The third deck over the ships' machinery and magazine was armored with two layers of Special treatment steel (STS) totaling  in thickness.

The spaces between them could be left empty or used as fuel tanks to absorb the detonation of a torpedo's warhead.

Aircraft
None of the designs made provision for aircraft. However, the Navy planned to adapt the poop deck of these vessels to accommodate aircraft at a later date.

Conversion
Construction finally began upon the battlecruisers in 1920 and 1921, after a delay of almost five months. However, that July, U.S. Secretary of State Charles Evans Hughes called for a conference in Washington D.C. to be held that November. The stated goal was to curb the rapidly growing and extremely expensive naval construction programs. It was obvious to the General Board that the expensive new battlecruisers, which some thought were already obsolete, would be very attractive targets for cancellation. Accordingly, studies were done exploring the possibilities of converting one or more of the battlecruisers to different uses: one looked at a conversion to an aircraft carrier, while another contemplated a conversion to an Atlantic ocean liner.

Conversion of a Lexington to an aircraft carrier had both positive and negative aspects when compared with a "specifically designed carrier". While the conversion would have better anti-torpedo protection, larger magazines for aircraft bombs than a keel-up carrier and more room for aircraft landings (the after elevator would be 28 feet farther up), it would also be a half-knot slower with less hangar space (about 16 percent less), less emergency fuel and "narrower lines" aft (pilots landing on the converted battlecruiser would not have as wide of a runway to aim for). Comparing costs, a brand-new aircraft carrier would cost $27.1 million, while a conversion of one of the Lexington class, not counting the $6.7 million already sunk into them, would cost $22.4 million.

Any debate over converting them was quelled by the signing of the Washington Naval Treaty. Under the terms of the treaty, any capital ships that were under construction by the five signatories (the United States, Great Britain, France, Italy and Japan) had to be canceled and scrapped. For battlecruisers, this encompassed the United States' Lexington class, Japan's , and Great Britain's G3 battlecruisers.

The problem was that the tonnage cap for new carrier construction had been set at 27,000 tons, which was too low for any practical conversion of the battlecruisers. An exception, spearheaded by Assistant Secretary of the Navy Theodore Roosevelt Jr., was added to the treaty. This gave the five nations the option to convert no more than two capital ships that were under construction to 33,000 ton aircraft carriers. But even that increase of 6,000 tons (from 27,000 to 33,000) was almost not enough for a conversion—it took creative interpreting of a clause in the treaty to allow for the conversion without removing half of the power plant, which the General Board did not want to do. The clause (Chapter II, Part III, Section I, (d)):

Without this clause, the two carriers would have likely been in serious trouble—1928 estimates for the two ships put Lexington at an actual tonnage of 35,689 tons and Saratoga at 35,544, though on official lists the number given was 33,000 tons with a footnote that stated "[this number] does not include weight allowance under Ch. 11, pt. 3, Sec. 1, art. (d) of Washington Treaty for providing means against air and submarine attack". This tonnage was used by these ships for their entire careers.

Ships in class

Following adoption of the Washington Naval Treaty, construction on all the ships was stopped in February 1922. Two of the battlecruiser hulls were reordered as the s  and  under the terms of the Treaty, while the other four ships were formally cancelled and scrapped in place. Due to the planned re-use of the name,  was renamed Old Constitution from 1 December 1917 until the name was returned on 24 July 1925.

See also

 List of cruisers of the United States Navy

Notes

References

Notes

Footnotes

Bibliography

External links

 Class description at Global Security

Battlecruiser classes
 
Abandoned military projects of the United States